Victoria Park Place is Windsor, Ontario's second tallest building (after Caesars Windsor's "Augustus" Hotel tower), standing at 34 storeys (3 below-ground floors, and 31 above-ground floors). Its construction started in 1979 and was a jointly built venture by Danzig Enterprises Limited & Wonsch Construction. The building uses reinforced concrete construction and concrete plank. The apartment tower is easily identifiable from its "L" shape. It stands at the corner of Park Street and Victoria Avenue in downtown Windsor, on a site formerly occupied by the old Norton Palmer Hotel.  The high-rise apartment building takes up a full city block, and is across Pelissier Street from the Royal Windsor Terrace Condominiums.

The high-rise uses the modern architecture style, incorporating a great deal of glass and steel. Along its southwest corner (the edge of its "L" shape), elevators travel along the shafts, with a clear view of the streets below.

At one time, it housed a news bureau for CKCO-TV on its ground floor, which has since been turned into a convenience store. The building also holds the television transmitter for CHWI-TV-60 on the roof, repeating the signal to the Windsor area.

External links 
 Google Maps location of Victoria Park Place
 Victoria Park Place Essex Condominium Plan #35 Information
 Victoria Park Place Listed Condos for Sale by Owners
 Victoria Park Place at Emporis.com
 SkyscraperPage.com's Profile on Victoria Park Place

Skyscrapers in Windsor, Ontario
Residential condominiums in Canada
Residential skyscrapers in Canada